The Waldwick Public School District is a comprehensive community public school district that serves students in pre-kindergarten through twelfth grade from Waldwick, in Bergen County, New Jersey, United States.

As of the 2020–21 school year, the district, comprised of four schools, had an enrollment of 1,630 students and 141.3 classroom teachers (on an FTE basis), for a student–teacher ratio of 11.5:1.

The district is classified by the New Jersey Department of Education as being in District Factor Group "GH", the third-highest of eight groupings. District Factor Groups organize districts statewide to allow comparison by common socioeconomic characteristics of the local districts. From lowest socioeconomic status to highest, the categories are A, B, CD, DE, FG, GH, I and J.

Awards and recognition
During the 2009–10 school year, Julia A. Traphagen School was awarded the National Blue Ribbon School Award of Excellence by the United States Department of Education, the highest award an American school can receive. It was the only school in Bergen County that year out of ten schools honored statewide and the first Bergen County elementary school to receive the honor in six years.

Schools 
Schools in the district (with 2020–21 enrollment data from the National Center for Education Statistics) are:
Elementary schools
Crescent School with 344 students in grades K–5
Brian R. Cannici, Principal
Julia A. Traphagen School with 425 students in grades PreK–5
Robert T. Sileo, Principal
Middle school
Waldwick Middle School with 367 students in grades 6–8
Michael J. Meyers, Principal
High school
Waldwick High School with 460 students in grades 9–12
Kevin Carroll, Principal

Administration 
Core members of the district's administration are:
Dr. Paul Casarico, Superintendent
John Griffin, Business Administrator / Board Secretary

Board of education
The district's board of education is comprised of seven members who set policy and oversee the fiscal and educational operation of the district through its administration. As a Type II school district, the board's trustees are elected directly by voters to serve three-year terms of office on a staggered basis, with either two or three seats up for election each year held (since 2012) as part of the November general election. The board appoints a superintendent to oversee the district's day-to-day operations and a business administrator to supervise the business functions of the district.

References

External links 
Waldwick Public School District

School Data for the Waldwick Public School District, National Center for Education Statistics

Waldwick, New Jersey
New Jersey District Factor Group GH
School districts in Bergen County, New Jersey